German rapper Haftbefehl has released four studio albums: one collaborative album and two mixtapes.

Albums

Studio albums

Collaborative albums

Mixtapes

Singles

As lead artist

Freetracks 
 2009: An alle Azzlackz
 2009: Wieso, Warum (feat. Jonesmann)
 2009: Wir feuern dich (feat. Jonesmann & Criz)
 2009: Zu groß (feat. Jonesmann & Manuellsen)
 2009: Wie die Tränen meiner Mutter
 2009: Sound für die Nacht (feat. JAM)
 2009: Koma (Remix) (feat. Blaze, Jonesmann, Favorite & Vega (Rapper)|Vega)
 2010: Bitch da hast du
 2010: An alle Azzlacks
 2010: Schwarz (feat. Afro Hesse)
 2010: Psst! (MeineStadt2010)
 2010: Nightlife (feat. Inferno und Aikido)
 2010: Wir machen Patte (feat. Doezis und Kamran)
 2010: Ich nehm dir alles weg
 2010: Für die Jungs (feat. Omik K.)
 2010: OF Crackflow
 2010: Azzlack zerbersten (feat. Zerbersten)
 2010: Columbine! (feat. Silla, Twin und Criz)
 2010: Chabo Nation Azzlackz (feat. Son Saifa und Midy Kosov)
 2018: Mathematik Lindemann (feat. Haftbefehl)

Juice-Exclusives 
 2009: Spiel mit dem Feuer (feat. Blaze, Criz und Jonesmann) (Juice-Exclusive! auf Juice-CD #99)
 2009: Duck dich (feat. Blaze, Criz und Jonesmann) (Juice Exclusive! auf Juice-CD #100)
 2010: Streichhölzer & Benzinkanister (Juice-Exclusive! auf Juice-CD #107)
 2018: Mathematik (feat. Lindemann)

Halt die Fresse 
 2009: Halt die Fresse : 01 - NR. 32 - Haftbefehl
 2010: Halt die Fresse : 03 - NR. 78 - Haftbefehl
 2011: Halt die Fresse Gold - NR. 02 - Haftbefehl
 2012: Halt die Fresse : 04 - NR. 187 - Haftbefehl
 2012: Halt die Fresse : 04 - NR. 215 - Haftbefehl (feat. Xatar, Celo & Abdi und Capo)
 2013: Halt die Fresse : 05 - NR. 267 - Haftbefehl (feat. Veysel)
 2013: Halt die Fresse Platin - 01 - Haftbefehl
 2014: Halt die Fresse : 06 - NR. 329 - Milonair & Haftbefehl („Ballermann“)

Guest appearances

References

Discographies of German artists
Hip hop discographies